Christ Church Parish may refer to:

 Christ Church parish, Barbados
 Christ Church Parish Church, Oistins, Christ Church, Barbados